Noah Kibet (born 12 April 2004) is a Kenyan middle-distance runner. He won the silver medal in the men's 800 metres event at the 2022 World Athletics Indoor Championships held in Belgrade, Serbia.

International competitions

References

External links 
 

Living people
2004 births
Place of birth missing (living people)
Kenyan male middle-distance runners
World Athletics Indoor Championships medalists
21st-century Kenyan people